Lorenzo Viotti (born 15 March 1990) is a Swiss conductor. He is currently chief conductor of the Netherlands Philharmonic Orchestra, the Netherlands Chamber Orchestra, and Dutch National Opera.

Biography
Born in Lausanne the son of conductor Marcello Viotti, Viotti studied piano, voice and percussion in Lyon.  In Vienna, he attended the conducting class of Georg Mark, and played as a percussionist with several orchestras, including the Vienna Philharmonic.  He continued conducting studies at the Hochschule für Musik Franz Liszt in Weimar with Nicolás Pasquet, completing his studies in 2015. Growing up, he enjoyed playing funk and jazz music as a drummer, and played in his sister Marina Viotti's death metal band in order to have the "biggest possible musical vocabulary possible."

In 2012, Viotti was recipient of the first prize at the Cadaqués Orchestra International Conducting Competition. In 2015, he won the Nestlé and Salzburg Festival Young Conductors Awards. He won the conducting competition of the MDR Sinfonieorchester in 2016. He was chosen "Newcomer of the Year" at the International Opera Award 2017.

In January 2017, Viotti first guest-conducted the Gulbenkian Orchestra, and returned in the same season for a second guest-conducting appearance.  In October 2017, the Gulbenkian Orchestra announced the appointment of Viotti as its next music director, effective with the 2018–2019 season, with an initial contract of three seasons.  Viotti stood down as music director of the Gulbenkina Orchestra in 2021 and now has the title of principal guest conductor with the orchestra.

In February 2018, Viotti first guest-conducted the Netherlands Philharmonic Orchestra (NedPhO). In April 2019, the NedPhO announced the appointment of Viotti as its next chief conductor, effective with the 2021–2022 season. With this appointment, Viotti also simultaneously became chief conductor of the Netherlands Chamber Orchestra and of Dutch National Opera.

Brand Partnerships
As of September 2022, Viotti has been a brand ambassador for Bulgari for both their watches and men's fragrances. He has also been featured in advertisements for Lamborghini in their "Huracán Tecnica" campaign.

References

External links 
 Lorenzo Viotti Operabase
 
 Hilbert Artists Management agency biography of Lorenzo Viotti
 'Lorenzo Viotti über "Werther" und seine Zeit in Frankfurt', Interview by Zsolt Horpácsy, 5 December 2017, Oper Frankfurt blog
 'Opéra national de Lyon 2016–2017: Viva la Mamma de Gaetano Donizetti le 22 Juin 2017 (Dir.mus: Lorenzo Viotti; Mise en scène: Laurent Pelly)', Le blog du Wanderer blog, 28 June 2017
 

Swiss conductors (music)
Male conductors (music)
Living people
1990 births
Hochschule für Musik Franz Liszt, Weimar alumni
People from Lausanne
21st-century conductors (music)
21st-century male musicians